Onkamojärvi is a lake in Salla municipality, Lapland, Finland. It is located on the border of Finland and Russia, most of the lake being on the Finnish side of the border. The lake's surface is 290.5 metres above sea level, and its area is about 18 km2. There are 32 islands in the lake, including Kallunkisaari, Karvastekemäsaari, Kätkänsuusaari, Lujesaaret, Majavasaari, Markuksen aittasaari, Nilisaari, Oravasaari, Paltsarsaari, Peurasaari, Saaranpaskantamasaari, Talvitiensuusaari, Tossonsaari and Vitsinsaari.

References

External links
 Лист карты Q-35-XI,XII Куолаярви. Масштаб: 1:200 000.

Lakes of Murmansk Oblast
Finland–Russia border
International lakes of Europe
LOnkamojarvi
Lakes of Salla